Sister Wife is a 2000 documentary that follows the African Hebrew Israelites, an African American community that immigrated to Israel and practices polygamy. The men can have up to seven wives. The film follows a couple that has been married for 21 years as they decide to take on another wife.

External links

The Jewish Channel's review
Distributor's website
Distributor's films site

2000 films
Israeli documentary films
Documentary films about Jews and Judaism
Hebrew-language films
Documentary films about African Americans
Polygamy
2000 documentary films
Documentary films about polygamy
Black Hebrew Israelites
2000s English-language films
English-language documentary films